Never Had a Dream Come True may refer to:

 "Never Had a Dream Come True" (S Club 7 song)
 "Never Had a Dream Come True" (Stevie Wonder song)

See also
 Dreams Come True (disambiguation)